Sir Herbert Perrott Pakington, 5th Baronet (c. 1701 – 24 September 1748), of Westwood, near Droitwich, Worcestershire, was an English Tory politician who sat in the House of Commons from 1727 to 1741.

Early life
Pakington was the only surviving son of Sir John Packington and his second wife, Hester Perrott. He married Elizabeth Conyers, daughter of John Conyers, K.C., of Walthamstow, Essex on. 22 June 1721. On the death of his father in 1727, he succeeded to the baronetcy and Westwood House.

Career
Pakington was returned as Tory  Member of Parliament  for Worcestershire at the 1727 British general election in succession to  his father. He was returned  unopposed at the 1734 British general election. He voted against the Administration in all known divisions except on the motion to remove Walpole in February 1741. He did not stand  in 1741.

Packington was one of the lovers of the courtesan Teresia Constantia Phillips. Packington was so obsessed with her that he twice attempted suicide to keep her attention.

Death and legacy
Pakington died on 24 September 1748. He had two sons, John and Herbert Perrott, who became the sixth and seventh Pakington baronets, respectively.

References

1700s births
1748 deaths
People from Droitwich Spa
Members of the Parliament of Great Britain for Worcestershire
Year of birth uncertain
British MPs 1727–1734
British MPs 1734–1741
Baronets in the Baronetage of England